is a railway station on the Amagi Line located in Chikuzen, Fukuoka Prefecture, Japan. It is operated by the Amagi Railway, a third sector public-private partnership corporation.

Lines

Layout
The station consists of a side platform serving a single track. There is no station building, only a shelter on the platform for waiting passengers. A ramp leads up to the platform from the access road. A bike shed is provided near the station entrance.

Platforms

Adjacent stations

History
Japanese National Railways (JNR) opened the station on 1 November 1960 with the name Chikuzen Takata as an added station on its existing Amagi Line track. On 1 April 1986, control of the station was handed over to the Amagi Railway. The name of the station was changed to Takata on the same day.

Surrounding area 
 Kirin Brewery Fukuoka Factory
 Ministop store
 Japan National Route 500

References

Railway stations in Fukuoka Prefecture
Railway stations in Japan opened in 1960